David Hugh Mellor  (10 July 1938  – 21 June 2020) was a British philosopher. He was a Professor of Philosophy and Pro-Vice-Chancellor, later Professor Emeritus, of Cambridge University.

Biography
Mellor was born in London on 10 July 1938, and educated at Manchester Grammar School. He studied chemical engineering at Pembroke College, Cambridge (BA 1960). His first formal study of philosophy was at the University of Minnesota where he took a minor in Philosophy of Science under Herbert Feigl. From Minnesota he obtained an MSc in 1962. He obtained his PhD in philosophy, with a thesis written under the supervision of Mary Hesse, at Pembroke in 1968. He was awarded a Sc.D. from Cambridge in 1990.

His primary work was in metaphysics, although his philosophical interests included philosophy of science, philosophy of mind, philosophy of time, probability and causation, laws of nature and properties, and decision theory. Mellor was Professor of Philosophy at the University of Cambridge and Fellow of Darwin College from 1971 to 2005.

Mellor was in the news in 1992, when he argued against Cambridge awarding an honorary degree to Jacques Derrida, a French philosopher known for his theory of “deconstruction”. A formal ballot decided to award the degree, but Mellor said it was undeserved, explaining: "He is a mediocre, unoriginal philosopher — he is not even interestingly bad." He also commented that it had been "a bad year for bullshit in Cambridge."

Mellor was president of the Aristotelian Society from 1992 to 1993, a member of the Humanist Philosophers' Group of the British Humanist Association and  Honorary Fellow of the Australian Academy of the Humanities. He was a Fellow of the British Academy between 1983 and 2008. In retirement Mellor held the title of emeritus professor.

A festschrift, Real Metaphysics: Essays in Honour of D. H. Mellor, was published in 2003.

Mellor was also an amateur theatre actor.

He died on 21 June 2020.

Publications
The Matter of Chance (1971). Cambridge University Press.
Real Time (1981). Cambridge University Press.
Matters of Metaphysics (1991). Cambridge University Press.
The Facts of Causation (1995). Routledge.
Real Time II (1998). Routledge.
Probability: A Philosophical Introduction (2005). Routledge.
Mind, Meaning, and Reality (2012). Oxford University Press

*For more complete publication details see the tribute page by Tim Crane.

References

Sources
 Real Metaphysics: Essays in Honour of D. H. Mellor (2003). Hallvard Lillehammer and Gonzalo Rodriguez-Pereyra ed.

External links 

 Australian Academy of the Humanities obituary by Stewart Candlish
Interviews with Philosophy Bites:
Hugh Mellor on Time (2008)
 Hugh Mellor on Frank Ramsey on Truth (2011)
Hugh Mellor on Probability (2014)
 Better Than The Stars 1978 BBC Radio programme made by Mellor about Frank Ramsey (featuring interviews with A. J. Ayer and Richard Braithwaite).
 and "Cambridge Philosophers I: F. P. Ramsey" text of an article derived from the 1978 radio programme [previously published in Philosophy 70, 243-62  (1995)]
"An Interview with Hugh Mellor" [reproduced, with permission, from Key Philosophers in Conversation: the Cogito interviews. Pyle, Andrew. London: Routledge. 1999. . .]
Archived versions of Mellor's homepage and Faculty page
Tribute page by Tim Crane

20th-century British philosophers
2020 deaths
1938 births
Fellows of Darwin College, Cambridge
Alumni of Pembroke College, Cambridge
British humanists
Presidents of the Aristotelian Society
Fellows of the British Academy
Academics from London
Bertrand Russell Professors of Philosophy